A  ("curtain") was a type of awning used in Roman times. Precisely how the awning was supported is a matter of conjecture.

History 
Retractable awnings were relatively common throughout the Roman Empire, including on the wooden amphitheater that preceded the Colosseum.

The Colosseum 
The Colosseum being the biggest amphitheater of Roman times, the  that covered it  was the biggest that ever was as well. It provided shade from the sun for up to one third of the arena. The  also created a ventilation updraft, creating circulation and a cool breeze.

In modern times 
The Puy du Fou theme park, in France, has a Roman-style amphitheatre built for some of its shows, complete with an antique-style velarium.

References 

Ancient Roman architectural elements
Shading (Architecture)